Ibach House is a historic home located at Munster, Lake County, Indiana.  It was built in 1924, and is a -story, five bay, Colonial Revival style brick dwelling with a side-gable roof.  It sits on a full basement of concrete block.  It features a front portico supported by two Tuscan order columns and an attached sunroom.

It was listed in the National Register of Historic Places in 2010.

References

Houses on the National Register of Historic Places in Indiana
Colonial Revival architecture in Indiana
Houses completed in 1924
Buildings and structures in Lake County, Indiana
National Register of Historic Places in Lake County, Indiana